TOP Media,(also known as T.O.P Media) is a South Korean company, founded by Shinhwa's Andy, handling the management of several artists. TOP Media usually works with Sony Music Entertainment Korea for distribution of its musical releases.

History
TOP Media was founded as ND Entertainment (New Dream Entertainment) by Andy and his former long-time manager at SM Entertainment, Lee Jae-hong, in 2005. In 2009, the company debuted Jumper, a male pop duo, who released two singles, "Yes!" and "Dazzling". Jumper, however, disbanded soon after the release of their second single. A year later, Teen Top debuted, followed by 100% in 2012, and Up10tion in 2015. The company's newest boy group, MCND, debuted on February 27, 2020 with the EP Into the Ice Age. On October 9, 2021, 100% disbanded after all remaining members' contracts expired and left the company. In January 2022, Teen Top members Niel and Changjo's contracts expired. In March 2023, the contracts of several members of Up10tion expired.

Artists

Current artists

Soloists
 Andy
 Kim Woo-seok

Groups
 Teen Top
 Up10tion
 MCND

Actors
 Han Gyu-jin
Kim Woo-seok

Musical actors
Chunji
Ricky
Sunyoul

Former artists
Jang Hyunwoo
Jumper (2009)
Teen Top
L.Joe (2010–2017)
Niel (2010–2022)
Changjo (2010–2022)
100% (2012–2021)
Sanghoon (2012–2014)
Changbum (2012–2016)
Minwoo (2012–2018)
Rockhyun (2012–2021)
Jonghwan (2012–2021)
Chanyong (2012–2021)
Hyukjin (2012–2021)
 Eric (2019–2022)
Up10tion
Jinhoo (2015–2023)
Kuhn (2015–2023)
Kogyeol (2015–2023)
Bitto (2015–2023)
Sunyoul (2015–2023)
Gyujin (2015–2023)
Lee Jin-hyuk (2015–2023)

References

External links
 

Talent agencies of South Korea
South Korean record labels
Record labels established in 2007
Labels distributed by Kakao M